USS Sentinel (AM-412) was a steel-hulled fleet (oceangoing) minesweeper of the  planned for the United States Navy. She was a part of a group of minesweepers scheduled to be built as replacements and for Lend-Lease commitments. On 12 August 1945, three days before hostilities ceased in the Pacific, the U.S. Navy cancelled its contract with the Defoe Shipbuilding Co., Bay City, Michigan, for the construction of Sentinel.

References 
 
 

 

Admirable-class minesweepers
Cancelled ships of the United States Navy